The 1987–88 season was the 42nd season of competitive football played by Dinamo Zagreb.

First Federal League

Matches

Classification

Results summary

N.B. Points awarded for a win: 2

Yugoslav Cup

Players

Squad statistics
Competitive matches only. Age as of 2 August 1987, first match day of the season. Appearances in brackets indicate numbers of times the player came on as a substitute.
Source:

See also
1987–88 Yugoslav First League
1987–88 Yugoslav Cup

References
General

Specific

External links
 Dinamo Zagreb official website

1987-88
Yugoslav football clubs 1987–88 season